Granulocystis is a genus of algae belonging to the family Oocystaceae.

Species:

Granulocystis chlamydomonadoides 
Granulocystis echinulata 
Granulocystis exuviata 
Granulocystis helenae 
Granulocystis ruzickae 
Granulocystis verrucosa

References

Oocystaceae
Trebouxiophyceae genera
Trebouxiophyceae